Dwari Khola Small Hydropower Station (Nepali: द्वारी खोला सानो जलविद्युत आयोजना) is a run-of-river hydro-electric plant located in Naumule , Dailekh District of Nepal. The flow from Dwari River is used to generate 3.75 MW electricity. The gross head is 450.40 m and design flow is 1.58 m3/s. The intake is located 3 km upstream of the confluence of the Dwari Khola and Lohore Khola and the powerhouse 300 meters downstream from the confluence.

The plant is owned and developed by Bhugol Energy Development Company Pvt Ltd, an IPP of Nepal. The plant started generating electricity from 2074-01-23BS. The generation licence will expire in 2106-02-25 BS, after which the plant will be handed over to the government.  The power station is connected to the national grid at Narayan Nagarpalika and the electricity is sold to Nepal Electricity Authority.

The construction cost of the project was NPR 74 Crore.

Controversies
The local had sold 5m width of land stretching along the pipeline for construction works, but the project used 15 m without compensation.

See also

List of power stations in Nepal

References

Hydroelectric power stations in Nepal
Gravity dams
Run-of-the-river power stations
Dams in Nepal
Irrigation in Nepal
Buildings and structures in Dailekh District